Bryant Jacob "Jake" Coker (born August 4, 1992) is a former American football quarterback. He played college football at Florida State and Alabama. He won the national championship with the Alabama Crimson Tide in his senior year in 2015.

Early years
Coker attended St. Paul's Episcopal School in Mobile, Alabama. He played both football and basketball. He was ranked by Rivals.com as the 18th best pro-style quarterback recruit in his class. He committed to Florida State University in June 2010.

College career
Coker was redshirted as a freshman in 2011. As a backup to EJ Manuel in 2012, he appeared in three games, completing three-of-five passes for 45 yards and one touchdown. As a redshirt sophomore, Coker competed with Jameis Winston for the starting quarterback job in 2013. Winston won the job and Coker was his backup until a knee injury in November caused him to miss the rest of the season. He had appeared in six games, going 18 of 36 for 250 yards and one interception.

In January 2014, Coker transferred to the University of Alabama. He was eligible to play immediately and did not have to sit out a year after graduating from Florida State in April. In his first year at Alabama he competed for the Crimson Tide's starting job. Blake Sims won the competition with Coker as the backup. Coker again competed for the starting job in 2015, and this time won the competition.

Coker helped lead the Crimson Tide to win the 2016 College Football Playoff National Championship Game against the Clemson Tigers, with a final score of 45–40.

On January 30, 2016, Coker was the starting quarterback for the South in the Senior Bowl in Mobile, Alabama. In one quarter, he was 3-of-8 passing for 23 yards and led his team to the first touchdown of the game.

Professional career
On April 30, 2016, Coker signed a free agent deal with the Arizona Cardinals after going undrafted in the 2016 NFL Draft. He was released by the team on August 29, 2016, as part of a roster cut to 75 players.

On April 21, 2017, after being unable to fully recover from knee surgery, Coker announced his retirement from football. “I’m just going to move on,” Coker said. “I had another surgery when I was with the (Arizona) Cardinals, and that was kind of the last thing. I didn’t want another surgery. I’m just kind of ready to move on. I’m excited about what’s ahead.”

References

External links
 Alabama Crimson Tide bio 
 Florida State Seminoles bio

1992 births
Living people
Sportspeople from Mobile, Alabama
Players of American football from Alabama
American football quarterbacks
Florida State Seminoles football players
Alabama Crimson Tide football players
Arizona Cardinals players